Słowiki Stare  or Stare Słowiki is a village in the administrative district of Gmina Sieciechów, within Kozienice County, Masovian Voivodeship, in east-central Poland.

The word słowiki means "nightingales" in Polish. Stare means "Old" – distinguishing this village from the nearby Słowiki Nowe ("New").

References

External links
 
 

Villages in Kozienice County